Skellerup is a New Zealand-based manufacturer of industrial and agricultural rubber products. The company, then called Para Rubber Company, was founded by George Skellerup in 1910 when he opened his first retail shop in Christchurch and now employs over 800 people in New Zealand, Australia, the United Kingdom, United States and China.

The brand is considered iconic by many New Zealanders, being a leading producer of gumboots. "Jandals", the common name for flip-flops in New Zealand , is a trademark of Skellerup. In 1969, Skellerup was the founding sponsor of the Young Farmer of the Year competition, a relationship which lasted 29 years.

In 2015, its product lineup includes a variety of agricultural components and products for the dairy industry, such as milk liners and livestock health management products. Skellerup also manufactures industrial products to assist with hydraulics, fluids, water-proofing, and water pumps.

As of December 2015, Skellerup was one of the components of the NZX 50 Index, with a market capitalisation of over $240m NZD. Major investments in a new  Dairy Rubberware factory in Christchurch were made to drive profit increases over 2016 and 2017.

References

External links
 Skellerup Holdings
 Para Rubber

Manufacturing companies based in Auckland
1910 establishments in New Zealand
Companies listed on the New Zealand Exchange
Manufacturing companies established in 1910
New Zealand brands